USS Badoeng Strait (CVE-116)  was a  of the United States Navy during the Korean War.

She was named after the Badung Strait, located between the Indonesian islands of Bali and Nusa Besar, which was the site of a World War II battle in February 1942, between American–Netherlands and Japanese naval forces.

Initially named San Alberto Bay, the vessel was renamed Badoeng Strait on 6 November 1944; launched 15 February 1945 by Todd-Pacific Shipyards, Inc., Tacoma, Washington; sponsored by Mrs. T. H. Binford, wife of Captain Binford; commissioned 14 November 1945, Captain Thomas A. Turner, Jr. in command; and reported to the Pacific Fleet.

Operational history

Initial service
Badoeng Strait operated out of San Diego until March 1946, when she made a brief cruise to Hawaii. On 20 April 1946 she was placed out of commission and was subsequently recommissioned on 6 January 1947.

Between February 1947 and June 1950 Badoeng Strait operated in the Pacific, testing new anti-submarine warfare equipment, training her personnel, and participating in numerous anti-submarine warfare exercises. At various intervals she served as flagship of Carrier Divisions 17 and 15.

Korean War
From July 1950 until February 1953 Badoeng Strait completed three tours off Korea (29 July 1950– 23 January 1951, 2 October 1951– 14 February 1952, and 6 October 1952– 11 February 1953), as a unit of TF's 95 and 77. During these tours she operated on anti-submarine warfare duty and as a part of the blockade-escort force. Her aircraft provided invaluable close ground support during the early period of the action, particularly during the defense of the Pusan Perimeter (6 August – 12 September 1950), Inchon landing (15 September), and Hŭngnam evacuation (9–24 December 1950). Badoeng Strait received the Navy Unit Commendation and six battle stars for her services during the Korean action.

Post-war
After 1953 the ship underwent modernization (April to September 1953); continued extensive experimental work in anti-submarine warfare with new naval aircraft and helicopters, participated in various Pacific Fleet training exercises and carried out extensive exercises with Marine assault helicopters. She has also completed another tour of the Far East and participated in Operation Redwing in the Pacific Proving Grounds during February–July 1956 where she and her crew witnessed all 17 detonations.

Decommissioning
On 14 January 1957 Badoeng Strait sailed for Bremerton, Washington, for inactivation. She went out of commission in reserve 17 May 1957 and was scrapped in 1972. Sold for scrapping to the Nicolai Joffre Corporation, Badoeng Strait was broken up at the company's San Francisco Bay area facility in Richmond, California, the former Kaiser Shipbuilding Yard No. 3.

As of 2021, no other U.S. Navy ship has been named Badoeng Strait.

In popular culture
Badoeng Strait and its role in the early days of the Korean War was a featured setting in the novels Under Fire and Retreat, Hell! by W.E.B. Griffin, books nine and ten of The Corps series.

Just before being scrapped in 1972, Badoeng Strait was used in filming the final scenes of the film Magnum Force.

See also
 VS-931, antisubmarine squadron

References

Commencement Bay-class escort carriers
1945 ships
Cold War escort carriers of the United States
Korean War escort carriers of the United States
Korean War aircraft carriers of the United States